Vincent C. Müller is a German philosopher.

He is Alexander von Humboldt Professor for ethics and philosophy of AI at the University of Erlangen-Nuremberg, senior research fellow at the University of Leeds, Turing Fellow at the Alan Turing Institute, president of the European Association for Cognitive Systems, and chair of the euRobotics topics group on 'ethical, legal and socio-economic issues'. Müller studied at the universities of Marburg, Hamburg, London and Oxford. He was Stanley J. Seeger Fellow at Princeton University and James Martin Research Fellow at the University of Oxford.

His research focuses on the nature and future of computational systems, mainly on the philosophy and ethics of AI.

References

Sources
 2013 Interview
 2022 Podcast "Deep Minds" (German)

External links
 . 2013 talk by Müller at EUCog III.
 "Is it time for robot rights?" at the Montreal Speaker Series in the Ethics of AI, 23.02.2020.

Living people
Academic staff of the Eindhoven University of Technology
Artificial intelligence ethicists
21st-century German philosophers
Year of birth missing (living people)
University of Hamburg alumni
University of Marburg alumni
Academics of the University of Leeds
Academic staff of the University of Erlangen-Nuremberg